Stark County Area Vocational School District is a school district located in Stark County, Ohio, United States.  It operates the R.G. Drage Career Center located in Massillon, Ohio.

External links
 R.G. Drage Official Site

School districts in Stark County, Ohio